The Tŏksan Line was a former non-electrified railway line of the Korean State Railway in Kangdong County, P'yŏngyang, North Korea, which ran from Songga on the P'yŏngdŏk Line to Tŏksan.

Route 

A yellow background in the "Distance" box indicates that section of the line is not electrified.

References

Railway lines in North Korea
Standard gauge railways in North Korea